Nelson County is a county in the U.S. state of North Dakota. As of the 2020 census, the population was 3,015. Its county seat is Lakota.

History
The Dakota Territory legislature created Nelson County on March 2, 1883, with areas annexed from Foster, Grand Forks and Ramsey counties, and with some previously unorganized area. It was not organized at that time, but was attached to Grand Forks County for administrative and judicial purposes. Its proposed boundary was enlarged on March 9, 1883, and on June 9, 1883, the county organization was effected and the administrative attachment to Grand Forks County was terminated.

Geography
The county terrain consists of rolling hills dotted with lakes and ponds. The area is largely devoted to agriculture. The terrain slopes to the south and east, with its highest point near the midpoint of its north boundary line, at 1,545' (471m) ASL.

Major highways

  U.S. Highway 2
  North Dakota Highway 1
  North Dakota Highway 15
  North Dakota Highway 32
  Nelson County Road 35

Adjacent counties

 Walsh County - northeast
 Grand Forks County - east
 Steele County - southeast
 Griggs County - south
 Eddy County - southwest
 Benson County - west
 Ramsey County - northwest

National protected areas

 Johnson Lake National Wildlife Refuge (part)
 Lambs Lake National Wildlife Refuge
 Rose Lake National Wildlife Refuge
 Stump Lake National Wildlife Refuge

Lakes

 Bitter Lake
 Church Lake
 Hillesland Lake
 Johnson Lake
 Lake Laretta
 Mannie Lake
 Omild Slough
 Ottofy Lake
 Rose Lake
 Rugh Lake
 Stump Lake
 Swan Lake

Demographics

2000 census
As of the 2000 census, there were 3,715 people, 1,628 households, and 1,004 families in the county. The population density was 3.78/sqmi (1.46/km2). There were 2,014 housing units at an average density of 2.05/sqmi (0.79/km2). The racial makeup of the county was 98.57% White, 0.08% Black or African American, 0.35% Native American, 0.30% Asian, 0.11% from other races, and 0.59% from two or more races. 0.16% of the population were Hispanic or Latino of any race. 53.4% were of Norwegian and 21.8% German ancestry.

There were 1,628 households, out of which 24.20% had children under the age of 18 living with them, 53.80% were married couples living together, 5.20% had a female householder with no husband present, and 38.30% were non-families. 36.30% of all households were made up of individuals, and 21.90% had someone living alone who was 65 years of age or older. The average household size was 2.18 and the average family size was 2.84.

The county population contained 22.10% under the age of 18, 4.00% from 18 to 24, 20.30% from 25 to 44, 26.20% from 45 to 64, and 27.40% who were 65 years of age or older. The median age was 47 years. For every 100 females there were 95.80 males. For every 100 females age 18 and over, there were 93.60 males.

The median income for a household in the county was $28,892, and the median income for a family was $37,406. Males had a median income of $27,163 versus $18,857 for females. The per capita income for the county was $16,320. About 7.20% of families and 10.30% of the population were below the poverty line, including 11.00% of those under age 18 and 10.30% of those age 65 or over.

2010 census
As of the 2010 census, there were 3,126 people, 1,474 households, and 905 families in the county. The population density was 3.18/sqmi (1.23/km2). There were 1,927 housing units at an average density of 1.96/sqmi (0.76/km2). The racial makeup of the county was 97.2% white, 1.0% American Indian, 0.3% black or African American, 0.1% Asian, 0.0% from other races, and 1.5% from two or more races. Those of Hispanic or Latino origin made up 1.1% of the population. In terms of ancestry, 52.3% were Norwegian, 34.1% were German, 8.2% were Irish, and 3.9% were American.

Of the 1,474 households, 21.4% had children under the age of 18 living with them, 52.1% were married couples living together, 5.4% had a female householder with no husband present, 38.6% were non-families, and 36.0% of all households were made up of individuals. The average household size was 2.07 and the average family size was 2.66. The median age was 51.5 years.

The median income for a household in the county was $39,071 and the median income for a family was $51,731. Males had a median income of $33,629 versus $28,672 for females. The per capita income for the county was $22,838. About 4.0% of families and 9.9% of the population were below the poverty line, including 14.0% of those under age 18 and 13.6% of those age 65 or over.

Communities

Cities

 Aneta
 Lakota (county seat)
 McVille
 Michigan City
 Pekin
 Petersburg
 Tolna

Census-designated place
 Dahlen

Unincorporated communities

 Kloten
 Mapes
 Pelto
 Whitman

Townships

 Adler
 Bergen
 Central
 Clara
 Dahlen
 Dayton
 Dodds
 Enterprise
 Field
 Forde
 Hamlin
 Illinois
 Lakota
 Lee
 Leval
 Melvin
 Michigan
 Nash
 Nesheim
 Ora
 Osago
 Petersburg
 Rubin
 Rugh
 Sarnia
 Wamduska
 Williams

Politics
Nelson County voters have slightly favored Republicans for the past several decades. Since 1964 the county selected the Republican Party candidate in 64% of national elections.

See also
 National Register of Historic Places listings in Nelson County, North Dakota

References

External links
 Nelson County map, North Dakota DOT

 
1883 establishments in Dakota Territory
Populated places established in 1883